Anthony Hall may refer to:

 Anthony Hall (antiquarian) (1679–1723), English clergyman and academic
 Anthony Hall (criminal) (1937–2011), British convicted murderer
 Anthony Hall (athlete) (born 1950), American javelin thrower
 Anthony Michael Hall (born 1968), American actor
 Anthony William Hall (1898–1947), UK royalty claimant
 J. Anthony Hall, British software engineer

See also
 Tony Hall (disambiguation)
 St. Anthony Hall, an undergraduate literary society